Ahmadabad (also Romanized as Aḩmadābād) is a village in Hamaijan Rural District, Hamaijan District, Sepidan County, Fars Province, Iran. At the 2006 census, its population was 104, in 27 families.

References 

Populated places in Sepidan County